Semyon Valeryevich Semenenko (born 9 July 1981) is a Russian professional football official and a former player. He works as a general director of FC Sibir Novosibirsk.

He made his debut in the Russian Premier League in 1999 for FC Lokomotiv Moscow. He played 2 games in the UEFA Cup 1999–2000 for FC Lokomotiv Moscow.

Honours
 Russian Premier League runner-up: 1999.
 Russian Cup winner: 2000.

References

1981 births
Sportspeople from Novosibirsk
Living people
Russian footballers
Russia youth international footballers
Russia under-21 international footballers
FC Lokomotiv Moscow players
FC Kuban Krasnodar players
FC Baltika Kaliningrad players
FC Lada-Tolyatti players
FC Sibir Novosibirsk players
Russian Premier League players
FC Sodovik Sterlitamak players
Association football defenders